The Mooncraft Special MCS 9, also known as the Reynard 89DGC (with the 'GC' suffix standing for Grand Champion), was a Japanese sports prototype race car, used in the Fuji Grand Champion Series, between 1988 and 1989. Based on either the Reynard 89D, or the Lola T88/50 Formula 3000 cars, it was powered by a  Mugen MF308 V8 engine, and ran on either Bridgestone or Dunlop tires.

References 

Sports prototypes
Sports racing cars